Reinhard W. Gebhardt (1858 - May 28, 1920 in Greenville, Texas) was a German composer and teacher, most active in New York. He was born in Anholt, Germany on April 3, 1858, to an extremely musical family.

Upbringing and career 
Gebhardt's father was a student of Felix Mendelssohn. He began his musical studies with his father and brother, both of whom were highly skilled musicians. Shortly after, he moved to Holland and began his formal education, and continuing his musical development. He became a student of Hendrik Arnoldus Meijroos (violinist), Rief (organ),  and Hans von Biilow and Carl Heymann (piano). Following his study, returned to Holland whereupon he began a three-country performance tour shortly after.

After an unknown period, Gebhardt moved to America where he began a career as a teacher, composer, and performer. However, as his health began to fail he moved to Paris, Texas where he continued his compositional career. According to the musical publication The Etude, he had won several prizes for his compositions. In 1916, he won the first prize for his piano work in the intermediate or advanced grade level. Around the mid-1910s, following his move to Paris, Texas he began the "Gebhardt College of Music."

Family 
Gebhardt was married to Helena Barbara "Helen" Seibert and had three confirmed daughters, Theodora "Adelaide," Estelle Sophie, and Viola Gertrude.

Compositions 

 Ballad (piano)
 Fantasie Impromptu (piano, Op. 45)
 Nocturne
 Theme and Finale
 Viola Waltz (Op. 38, dedicated to his daughter Viola)
 Nocturne Caprice (piano)
 When Two Dear Hearts Must Sever (voice and piano)
 Magic Spell
 Polonaise in F Major (piano, Op.62)
 Une Miniature (piano)

Notes

Resources 

German composers